Journey Into Melody is a Canadian music television miniseries which aired on CBC Television in 1958.

Premise
The music series was broadcast live from CBC's Halifax studios. It featured singer Bernard Johnson in the role of a travel clerk who dreams of visiting other places and times. For example, the second episode featured selected songs of Vienna at the beginning of the 20th century.

Series regulars included the Armadale Chorus and a 24-member orchestra led by Gordon MacPherson. Dance routines featured on the series were choreographed by Gunter Buchta.

Scheduling
This half-hour series was broadcast Sundays at 5:30 p.m. from 1 to 29 June 1958.

References

CBC Television original programming
1950s Canadian music television series
1958 Canadian television series debuts
1958 Canadian television series endings
Black-and-white Canadian television shows